This page lists the armoury emblazons, heraldic descriptions, or coats of arms of the communes in Nord (cities beginning I-P)

Complete lists of Nord armorial pages 

 Armorial of the Communes of Nord (A–C)
 Armorial of the Communes of Nord (D–H)
 Armorial of the Communes of Nord (I–P)
 Armorial of the Communes of Nord (Q–Z)

I

J

K

L

M

N

O

P

External links
 Liste des blasons des communes du nord -list of arms of the communes of Nord (in French)
 Liste des blasonnements des communes de Flandre et d'Artois – list of the blazons of communes in Flanders and Artois (in French)
 La page du généalogiste fou (in French)

References

Nord (French department)
Nord